Catastia subactualis is a species of snout moth in the genus Catastia. It was described by Herbert H. Neunzig in 2003 and is found in the US state of California.

References

Moths described in 2003
Phycitini